Indonesian Institute of the Arts, Surakarta (abbreviated by ISI Surakarta) is an arts university in Surakarta, Central Java, Indonesia. They are famous for teaching karawitan, wayang, Javanese dance, and other traditional crafts. The rector is Dr. Drs Guntur, M.Hum.

History 
The institute began in 1964 under the name Karawitan Arts Academy of Indonesia (Indonesian: Akademi Seni Karawitan Indonesia). By 1973, with the release of a decree from the Education and Cultural Ministry, the academy was able to open up a bachelor's degree program for Karawitan. In 1988, the academy underwent a structural and name change and became Indonesian Arts College of Surakarta (Indonesian: Sekolah Tinggi Seni Indonesia Surakarta). It was only in 2006 that the name Indonesian Institute of the Arts Surakarta became the official name of the school.

Logo and philosophy 
The institute unveiled its new logo in 2017. The new logo is a swan chimera in red and contains several parts, each with its own meaning.

 Swan, indicating explorer
 Urna, indicating sharp vision
 Patra eras, indicating discerning ears
 Dolphin fins and flukes, indicating directional control
 Eagle claws, indicating a principled character
 Mangosteen, indicating honesty
 Champak flower and leaves, indicating morality and service to other people

Campuses 
Indonesian Institute of the Arts Surakarta has two campuses, an older campus in Kentingan for the Faculty of Performing Arts and a newer one in Mojosongo for the Art and Design Faculty.

Faculties 
The institute serves both undergraduate and postgraduate students. Undergraduate students are able to choose from eight majors, divided into two faculties. Postgraduate students have two specializations that they can pick from.

Faculty of Performing Arts 

 Department of Ethnomusicology
 Department of Dance
 Department of Theater
 Department of Puppetry Arts

Faculty of Art and Design 

 Department of Arts and Crafts
 Department of Television and Film
 Department of Fine Arts
 Department of Interior Design

Postgraduate Faculty 

 Department of Art Appraisal
 Department of Art Production

Facilities

Performing arts center 
The institute has three performing arts centers that are located outdoors.

 Ampthiteater (Teater Terbuka)
 Humardani Theatre (Teater Humardani)
 Eden Park (Taman Eden)

Other facilities 
There are several other facilities that can be found in the Indonesian Institute of the Arts, Surakarta, including studios dedicated to each major, multimedia rooms; tennis, basketball, and volleyball field; library; and a mosque called Kalimasada Mosque.

Notable alumni
 Vincent McDermott
 Sumarsam

References

External links
 Official site

Colleges in Indonesia
Buildings and structures in Surakarta
Education in Central Java
Indonesian state universities